Rajka is a hybrid cultivar of domesticated apple from the Czech Republic, specifically for eating. Rajka was crossed and developed by the Institute of Experimental Botany from the Champion and Katka apples for scab resistance, hence possible to grow organic.

Description
Tree is moderately vigorous, standard type, produces spurs freely, precocious in cropping, highly productive, fruits do not fall prematurely, good pollinator with mid-season blossoming, resistant to scab and tolerant to powdery mildew.

Fruits are medium to large, globose conical, medium stem length. Yellow under-color is covered on almost the entire skin surface with an attractive bright red over-color. There is some russeting in stem cavity which occasionally may extend out over base. Flesh yellowish, juicy with medium grained texture and distinctive pleasant aroma.

Overall it is an early-winter, disease resistant, dessert variety with outstanding color, good rather sweet flavor and medium storage life. May be suited also to cooler areas. Has no specific requirements for rootstocks. Suitable for commercial orchards as well as for home gardens.

In United Kingdom
Rajka was introduced into the United Kingdom in the 1990s.

See also
Topaz (apple)

References

Orange Pippin
Orange Pippin UK

See also
List of apple cultivars

Czech apples
Apple cultivars